Catherine Eaton Skinner (born 1946) is a multimedia artist with studios in Seattle, Washington and Santa Fe, New Mexico.

Early life and education 

Catherine Eaton Skinner was raised in the Pacific Northwest. She received her BA in Biology from Stanford University while simultaneously studying painting with Bay Area Figurative painters Nathan Oliveira and Frank Lobdell. Working 20 years as a biological illustrator, Skinner specialized in the ecological integration of marine invertebrates and algae of the Pacific Coast. Now a multidisciplinary artist in painting, encaustic, photography, printmaking and sculpture, she divides her time between her studios in Seattle and Santa Fe.

Art 
Skinner's work is centered on the balance of opposites, as well as methods of numerical systems and patterning used to construct an order to our world. Drawn to marking methods that have been used by peoples and even some animals to indicate presence and construct a deeper relationship to place and nature, she moves from the simplicity of tantric forms to the complexities of grids. Much of her art encompasses repetition and multiplicity. The five elements—earth, fire, water, air, and space—also significantly interrelate in her work.

Bibliography 
Skinner's monograph, 108, published by Radius Books of Santa Fe, New Mexico, showcases twelve years of her work in which she pursued a deep investigation of this symbolic sacred number, using repetition in multiple explorations. Her artwork is included in Art of Discovery: Exploring a Northwest Art Collection, as well as the cover art of Others Will Enter the Gates and Speak For the Trees.  Unleashed, published by the University of Washington Press in conjunction with the Woodland Park Zoo, portrays her passion for animals and her relationship among them.

Press 
Over 100 publications (magazines, newspapers) have highlighted her work in feature articles and/or cover art work, including LandEscape Art Review, Art Reveal, Magazine 43, Contempo Annual, Saatchi Art's The Women-Only Edition of Invest In Art – Women's History Month, Blink Ink, iō Literary Journal, The Woven Tale Press, Apero and the New Mexico Bar Bulletin.

Selected exhibitions 
Skinner has had 39 solo exhibitions at, among others, Waterworks Gallery, Friday Harbor, Washington; Abmeyer + Wood Fine Art, Seattle, Washington; The San Francisco Gallery, San Francisco, California; Gallery Saoh & Tomos, Tokyo, Japan; and The Grace Museum, Abilene, Texas. Her work has been in numerous group exhibitions in museum and galleries, including the Royal Academy of Arts,  London, United Kingdom; Marin MOCA, Novato, California; Gallery Fritz, Santa Fe, New Mexico; Museum of Encaustic Art, Santa Fe, New Mexico; The City of Santa Fe Arts Commission Community Gallery, Santa Fe, New Mexico; the Japanese Handmade Paper Museum, Tokushima, Japan; and the Yellowstone Art Museum, Billings, Montana.

Collections 
Public collections include the Embassy of the United States, Tokyo, Japan; Boeing Corporation, Seattle, Washington; Henry Art Museum, University of Washington, Seattle, Washington; Tacoma Art Museum, Tacoma, Washington;  Museum of Northwest Art, La Conner, Washington; Virginia Mason Medical Center, Seattle, Washington; and Seattle University's Seeds of Compassion Collection, Seattle, Washington.

Further reading 
"Catherine Eaton Skinner/Specialty: Mixed Media." New Mexico State Committee of the National Museum of Women in the Arts, https://newmexicowomeninthearts.org/catherine-eaton-skinner

"Passages." ArLiJo (Arlington Literary Journal), http://www.arlijo.com/

Peace, Sarah, Ed.,"WordPower: Language as Medium." L I B R A R Y X, https://libraryx.org.uk/wordpower-language-as-medium/

Catherine Eaton Skinner interview. Art World Innovators, UMFM radio, University of Manitoba, Canada,https://umfm.com/programming/broadcast/art-world-innovators-march-21-2019

References

External links 

Stanford University alumni
1946 births
Living people
Pacific Northwest artists